is a Japanese rock band who debuted independently in 2003 and signed with Toshiba EMI in 2005. The band's name, Radwimps, was formed from two English slang terms, "rad" and "wimp". According to the band, the coined word had several meanings, including "excellent weakling" and "superlative coward".

Radwimps achieved commercial success in 2006 with their album Radwimps 4: Okazu no Gohan and are best known for their later singles "Order Made" (2008) and "Dada" (2011), both of which hit number one on Oricon's single charts. They have also gained recognition for providing the soundtrack to Your Name, one of the highest-grossing Japanese animated films, as well as the soundtrack to 2019's Weathering with You and 2022's Suzume.

History
Radwimps formed in 2001 in Kanagawa, Japan during their first year of high school. The five original members had been friends since middle school. Lead vocalist Yojiro Noda first became interested in music after hearing Oasis in middle school, when he would try to remember the guitar chords and sing to Oasis songs.

The band's activities were initially centred on Yokohama, and their first performance took place on BB Street in Kannai district on 5 February 2002. At this point, guitarist Akira Kuwahara dropped out of high school in order to focus on the band. In September and August 2002, Radwimps partook in the Yokohama High School Music Festival and eventually won the grand prize for the competition with the song "Moshi mo". "Moshi mo" was released as the band's debut single in May 2003, with 10,000 copies pressed and sold for 100 yen each. Following this single, Radwimps toured the Yokohama area, including a performance as the sole act at Yokohama's Club 24West. The band released their debut album, Radwimps, in July through independent label Newtraxx, featuring songs they wrote in middle school. The following August, after a guest appearance at the Yokohama High School Music Festival, the band went on hiatus for Noda and other members to focus on their school exams.

Radwimps returned from hiatus in March 2004, though Kei Asō, Yūsuke Saiki, and Akio Shibafumi did not rejoin the group. To replace the musicians, the band added acquaintances, such as drummer Satoshi Yamaguchi and bassist Yusuke Takeda. Radwimps immediately began recording new songs, and by July had released a second single, "Kiseki", and performed a three-month Japan-wide tour. Right after the end of the tour, the band started work on their second album, Radwimps 2: Hatten Tojō, which was finalized by the end of the year and released in March. Directly after the release, the group departed on a five-month  and also performed at high-profile summer music festivals, such as Setstock, Rock in Japan, and Summer Sonic. During this time, the band released a third single, "Hexun / Kanashi", which was their first charting release.

In November, the band made their major debut under Toshiba EMI, with the single "Nijūgoko-me no Senshokutai", followed by "EDP (Tonde Hi ni Iru Natsu no Kimi)" in January, both of which rose to the top 50. In shifting to a major label, Noda explained that the band took the same stance as they had as an independent group, and that "If we thought we were bigger on a major label, that would have been a big mistake". The band's third and first major-label album, Radwimps 3: Mujintō ni Motte Ikiwasureta Ichimai, regraded 3 in March 2006, was a landmark in establishing their popularity, debuting at number 13 on Oricon's album charts. Radwimps 3 saw a change in the band's musical style, allowing them to be more experimental in their sound.

By the end of 2006, the band's popularity had increased significantly: their album Radwimps 4: Okazu no Gohan, led by the top-20 singles "Futarigoto" and "Yūshinron" and the top-5 "Setsuna Rensa", debuted at number five and had an initial shipment of more than 100,000 copies. At this time, the band's older releases, such as Radwimps, Radwimps 2, and "Kiseki", began charting for the first time, with Radwimps eventually being certified Gold by the Recording Industry Association of Japan. In the next three years, both Radwimps and Radwimps 2 charted for approximately 100 weeks, and as of early 2011, Radwimps 3 and Radwimps 4 still continued to chart.

In 2008, the band achieved their first number-one single, with "Order Made", on the Oricon charts. Their 2009 album, Altocolony no Teiri, sold around 213,000 copies in its first week, debuting at number two on the Oricon charts. The band achieved their second Oricon number-one single, "Dada", in 2011.

In 2011, Radwimps released their sixth album, Zettai Zetsumei, which debuted at number two on the Oricon charts and went on to be certified Platinum by the RIAJ. Following this release, the band embarked on their Zettai Enmei Tour throughout Japan from April to August 2011.

On 11 March 2012, Radwimps released the single  on YouTube, commemorating the one-year anniversary of the 2011 Tōhoku earthquake and tsunami.

On 24 August 2016, Radwimps released the soundtrack album , to the anime film of the same name, directed by Makoto Shinkai. The film was an international success, further boosting the band's global profile and sending them to number two on the Billboard World Albums chart. The record also charted at number 16 on Billboard Heatseekers, and number 15 on Billboards Soundtrack Albums chart. In their home country of Japan, it was certified Double Platinum by the RIAJ, with over 500,000 copies sold, making it the band's best-selling album. It went on to win the Japan Record Special Award, the Japan Academy Prize for Outstanding Achievement in Music, and Soundtrack Album of the Year at the 31st Japan Gold Disc Awards.

Three months after that release, Radwimps returned with their ninth studio album, Human Bloom. On 19 April 2017, while in the middle of their Human Bloom Tour, Radwimps performed as a guest act for Coldplay's A Head Full of Dreams Tour at Tokyo Dome. In the same month, they also added Singapore to their Asian tour. On 10 May 2017, Radwimps released the single "Saihate Ai ni / Sennou".

At the end of 2018, they issued their next album, Anti Anti Generation, featuring Taka of One Ok Rock, singer-songwriter Aimyon, Tabu Zombie of Soil & "Pimp" Sessions, and rapper Miyachi. The record produced three  singles: "Saihate Aini / Brainwashing", "Mountain Top", and "Catharsis". The album peaked at number one on both Oricon and Japan's Billboard charts, receiving a Gold certification from the RIAJ for sales of 100,000 copies. The band followed it with their Anti Anti Generation Tour 2019, from June to August.

In 2019, Radwimps provided music for Shinkai's next film, Weathering with You, released on 19 July. The album debuted at number three on the Oricon Albums Chart before peaking at number two in the following week. It won the 34th Japan Gold Disc Award for Animation Album of the Year, which made it the top-selling anime album of 2019, with more than 128,000 copies sold that year. It also won the 43rd Japan Academy Film Prize for Best Music and Best Soundtrack at the 24th Space Shower Music Awards. The band launched a world tour with stops in the United States, Canada, and Mexico in July 2020. The tour was cancelled, however, due to the COVID-19 pandemic, and a planned Japan tour was postponed.

On 22 and 23 November 2020, Radwimps held a special fifteenth anniversary concert at Yokohama Arena.

In September 2021, Akira Kuwahara announced that he would go on hiatus for an indefinite period of time, after the weekly magazine Shūkan Bunshun reported his extramarital affair with a former model.

In 2022, Radwimps provided music for the film The Last Ten Years, released on 4 March. The same year, the band also wrote music for Shinkai's film Suzume, making this the third time they collaborated with the director. In October, Kuwahara returned to the band after his year-long hiatus.

Side projects

Radwimps have also released music under the moniker Misoshiru's ("The Miso-Soups"), beginning with the song "Jennifer Yamada-san" from the 2006 single "Yūshinron". A band with a primarily punk rock sound who perform disguised in Groucho glasses and red T-shirts, Misoshiru's released their debut album, Me So She Loose, in March 2013.

In 2008, Yojiro Noda acted as a record producer for the first time, writing and producing the song "Labrador" for singer Chara, which was used as the leading promotional track for her album Honey. During the recording sessions, Noda collaborated with musicians such as Nobuaki Kaneko (Rize), Yoshifumi Naoi (Bump of Chicken), Susumu Nishikawa (Diamond Head), and Koichi Tsutaya.

In 2010, Radwimps took part in a special project called Terrakoya, a commemorative band formed for the EMI Rocks 50th anniversary of EMI Music Japan rock concert, featuring Radwimps along with Acidman, Fujifabric, Atsushi Horie (Straightener), Susumu Nishikawa, The Telephones, and Kazuya Yoshii. The band released the song "Emi" in November, written by Noda in collaboration with Yoshii.

Yojiro Noda made his solo debut under the name Illion in 2013 and released his debut album, Ubu, on 25 February 2013, in the United Kingdom.

Songwriting
Lead vocalist Yojiro Noda writes all of the band's music and lyrics (the only exception currently is the bonus track "Yonaki" from Radwimps 4, written by Akira Kuwahara). Almost all of Noda's lyrics are based on events he has experienced, or nonfictional events. "Enren" from Radwimps 4: Okazu no Gohan, released in 2006, was the first fictional-themed song Noda wrote since the band formed.

Band members
Current members
  – lead vocals , rhythm guitar 
  – lead guitar, backing vocals 
  – bass guitar, backing vocals 
  – drums, backing vocals 

Former members
  – rhythm guitar 
  – bass guitar 
  – drums 

Touring members
  – drums 
  – drums 
  – drums 

Timeline

Discography

 Radwimps (2003)
 Radwimps 2: Hatten Tojō (2005)
 Radwimps 3: Mujintō ni Motte Ikiwasureta Ichimai (2006)
 Radwimps 4: Okazu no Gohan (2006)
 Altocolony no Teiri (2009)
 Zettai Zetsumei (2011)
 Batsu to Maru to Tsumi to (2013)
 Your Name. (2016)
 Human Bloom (2016)
 Anti Anti Generation (2018)
 Weathering with You (2019)
 Forever Daze (2021)
 Suzume (with Kazuma Jinnouchi) (2022)

Tours
  (2005)
  (2006)
  (2006)
  (2006)
  (2007)
  (2009)
  (2011)
 RADWIMPS GRAND PRIX (2014)
 RADWIMPS 2015 Asia–Europe Live Tour (2015)
 Human Bloom Tour (2017)
 RADWIMPS Asia Live Tour (2017)
 Road to Catharsis Tour (2018)
 RADWIMPS Asia Live Tour (2018)
 Anti Anti Generation Tour (2019)

Awards and nominations

|-
| rowspan="1" align="center"|2002
| rowspan="1"|Radwimps, "Moshi mo"
| Yokohama High School Music Festival
|
|-
| rowspan="1" align="center"|2007
| rowspan="1"|"Yūshinron"
| Space Shower Music Video Awards 2007 — Best Art Direction
|
|-
| rowspan="1" align="center"|2008
| rowspan="3"|"Order Made"
| MTV Video Music Awards Japan 2008 — Best Rock Video
|
|-
| rowspan="5" align="center"|2009
| Space Shower Music Video Awards 2009 — Best Your Choice
|
|-
| Space Shower Music Video Awards 2009 — Best Rock Video
|
|-
| RADWIMPS
| FM Festival "Life Music Award 2009" — Life Music of the Year
|
|-
| "Oshakashama"
| FM Festival "Life Music Award 2009" — Best Lyric of Life
|
|-
| rowspan="2" | Altocolony no Teiri
| FM Festival "Life Music Award 2009" — Best Album of Life
|
|-
| rowspan="3" align="center"|2010
| The Second CD Shop Awards
|
|-
| rowspan="2"|"Oshakashama"
| Space Shower Music Video Awards 2010 — Best Your Choice
|
|-
| MTV World Stage VMAJ 2010 — Best Rock Video
|
|-
| rowspan="3" align="center"|2011
| rowspan="2"|"Manifesto"
| Space Shower Music Video Awards 2011 — Best Your Choice
|
|-
| Space Shower Music Video Awards 2011 — Best Shooting Video
|
|-
| rowspan="1"|"Dada"
| 2011 MTV Video Music Aid Japan — Best Rock Video
|
|-
| align="center"| 2012
| "Kimi to Hitsuji to Ao"
| MTV Video Music Awards Japan 2012 — Best Rock Video
| 
|-
| align="center"| 2014
| "Last Virgin"
| MTV Video Music Awards Japan 2014 — Best Rock Video
| 
|-
| align="center" rowspan="3" | 2016
| RADWIMPS
| MTV Europe Music Awards 2016 — Best Japanese Act
| 
|-
| RADWIMPS
| Space Shower Music Video Awards 2016 — Best Group Artist
| 
|-
| RADWIMPS
| Japan Record Awards 2016 — Special Award
| 
|-
| align="center" rowspan="6" |2017
| Your Name
| Japan Academy Prize 2016 — Outstanding Achievement in Music
| 
|-
| "Zenzenzense" (movie ver.)
| Japan Gold Disc Award 2017 — Best 5 Songs by Download
| 
|-
| "Nandemonaiya" (movie ver.)
| Japan Gold Disc Award 2017 — Best 5 Songs by Download
| 
|-
| Your Name
| Japan Gold Disc Award 2017 — Soundtrack Album of the Year
| 
|-
| rowspan="2" |RADWIMPS
| Space Shower Music Awards 2017 — Best Rock Artist
|
|-
| Space Shower Music Awards 2017 — Artist of the Year
|
|-
| align="center" | 2018
| RADWIMPS
| Space Shower Music Awards 2018 — Best Group Artist
|
|-
| align="center" rowspan="4" | 2019
| rowspan="2"| RADWIMPS
| Space Shower Music Awards 2019 — Best Group Artist
|
|-
| Space Shower Music Awards 2019 — Best Active Overseas
|
|-
| "Catharsis"
| Space Shower Music Awards 2019 — Video of the Year
|
|-
| rowspan=4"| Weathering with You
| 74th Mainichi Film Awards — Best Music
|
|-
|align="center" rowspan=3"| 2020
| 34th Japan Gold Disc Award — Animation Album of the Year
| 
|-
| 43rd Japan Academy Film Prize — Best Music
| 
|-
| 24th Space Shower Music Awards — Best Soundtrack
| 
|-
|align="center" rowspan=1"| 2022
| "Ningen Gokko"
| MTV Video Music Awards Japan — Best Cinematography
| 
|-
|align="center" rowspan=1"| 2023
| Suzume (with Kazuma Jinnouchi)
| 46th Japan Academy Film Prize — Best Music
| 
|}

See also
 Japanese rock

References

External links
  
 
 Radwimps webcast RAD Locks! 

Japanese alternative rock groups
Japanese pop rock music groups
Japanese emo musical groups
Musical groups established in 2001
Musical groups from Kanagawa Prefecture
Universal Music Japan artists
2001 establishments in Japan
EMI Records artists
EMI Music Japan artists
Virgin Records artists